Roma Bene is a 1971 Italian comedy-drama film starring Virna Lisi, Nino Manfredi, Irene Papas and Senta Berger.

Plot 
The classic scene of the upper middle-class in Rome: a duchess, the industrial husband and the many apparently respectable characters. It is actually a parade of dingy types: the Baron is a jewel thief, among the others there are social climbers, unscrupulous nobles who staged fake kidnappings and extortion attempts, and even a wife who comes to commission the murder of the ship-owner husband. The fate of these people will be the same: death at sea, but their misdeeds instead will remain unaddressed and an overzealous police commissioner will be promoted and transferred.

Cast 
Nino Manfredi: Commissario Quintilio Tartamella
Philippe Leroy: Giorgio Santi
Virna Lisi: Duchessa Silvia Santi
Mario Feliciani: Teo Teopulos  
Irene Papas: Elena Teopulos
Evi Maltagliati: La madre di Elena  
Umberto Orsini: Principe Rubio Marescalli
Senta Berger: Principessa Dedé Marescalli 
Franco Fabrizi: Nino Rappi    
Michèle Mercier: Wilma Rappi
Vittorio Caprioli: Barone Maurizio De Vittis
Gastone Moschin: Il Monsignore  
Vittorio Sanipoli: Il Questore
Annabella Incontrera: La lesbica   
Enzo Cannavale: Agente Tognon
Peter Baldwin: Michele Vismara   
George Wang: Che-Fang   
Gigi Ballista: Vitozzi    
Minnie Minoprio: Minnie
Ely Galleani: Vivi Santi

External links 
 

1971 films
1970s black comedy films
1971 comedy-drama films
Italian comedy-drama films
Italian satirical films
Commedia all'italiana
Films about miscarriage of justice
Films directed by Carlo Lizzani
Films scored by Luis Bacalov
Italian black comedy films
Films set in Rome
Films set on ships
Films set in the Mediterranean Sea
1971 comedy films
1971 drama films
1970s Italian-language films
1970s Italian films